is a passenger railway station located in the city of Hidaka, Saitama, Japan, operated by the private railway operator Seibu Railway.

Lines

Station layout
The station consists of one island platform serving two tracks, connected to the station building by a level crossing.

History
The station opened on 10 September 1929.

Station numbering was introduced on all Seibu Railway lines during fiscal 2012, with Musashi-Yokote Station becoming "SI29".

Passenger statistics
In fiscal 2019, the station was used by an average of 295 passengers daily, making it the 91st of the Seibu network's ninety-two stations

The passenger figures for previous years are as shown below.

Surrounding area

References

External links

 Seibu Railway station information

Railway stations in Saitama Prefecture
Railway stations in Japan opened in 1929
Seibu Ikebukuro Line
Stations of Seibu Railway
Hidaka, Saitama